

Events 
 January–March 
 January 1 – At least 664 African slaves drown, when the Dutch West Indies Company slave ship Leusden capsizes and sinks in the Maroni River, during its arrival in Surinam.  The Dutch crew escapes, and leaves the slaves locked below decks to die.
 January 3 – George Frideric Handel's opera Faramondo is given its first performance.
 January 7 – After the Maratha Empire of India wins the Battle of Bhopal over the Jaipur State, Jaipur cedes the Malwa territory to the Maratha in a treaty signed at Doraha.
 February 4 – Court Jew Joseph Süß Oppenheimer is executed in Württemberg.
 February 11 – Jacques de Vaucanson stages the first demonstration of an early automaton, The Flute Player at the Hotel de Longueville in Paris, and continues to display it until March 30.
 February 20 – Swedish Levant Company founded.
 March 28 – Mariner Robert Jenkins presents a pickled ear, which he claims was cut off by a Spanish captain in the Caribbean in 1731, to the Parliament of Great Britain, which votes, 257 to 209, for war against Spain, leading to the War of Jenkins' Ear the following year. 
 March/April – Battle of the Dindar River: Emperor Iyasu II of Ethiopia is defeated by the Funj people.

 April–June 
 April 15 – Serse, an Italian opera by George Frideric Handel, premieres in London.
 April 18 – Spain's Royal Academy of History (Real Academia de la Historia) is established by decree of King Philip V of Spain. 
 April 28 – Pope Clement XII issues the papal bull In eminenti apostolatus, prohibiting Roman Catholics from being members of Masonic societies. 
 May 24 – John Wesley, newly returned from America, experiences a spiritual rebirth at a Moravian Church meeting in Aldersgate, in the City of London, essentially launching the Methodist movement; the day is celebrated annually by Methodists as Aldersgate Day (his younger brother Charles had a similar experience three days earlier).
 May 25 – The military phase of Cresap's War between the British North American Provinces of Maryland and Pennsylvania is ended when King George II of Great Britain negotiates a cease-fire.
 June 24 – British inventor Lewis Paul receives a patent for roller cotton-spinning machinery.
 June 27 – The Spanish Empire's Council of the Indies votes, 6 to 4, to re-establish the Viceroyalty of New Granada, incorporating modern-day Colombia, Ecuador, Venezuela and Panama. King Philip V issues the order on August 20, 1738.

 July–September 
 July 1 – English metallurgist William Champion is granted a patent for his process of extracting zinc from other materials in a furnace.
 July 10 – Thomas Pellow of Cornwall finally escapes captivity, 23 years after having been captured by Barbary pirates and held as a slave in Morocco. He arrives in British territory when the ship he is on sails into Gibraltar Bay on July 21, and later recounts his story in the book The Adventures of Thomas Pellow, of Penryn, Mariner: Three and Twenty Years in Captivity Among the Moors.
 August 10 – Russo-Turkish War (1735–1739): The Russian army begins its attempt to cross the Dniester River and fails after three weeks; they are later decimated by plague.
 September 18 – Samuel Johnson composes his first solemn prayer (published 1785).

 October–December 
 October 22 – The excavation of Herculaneum, a Roman city buried by Vesuvius in AD 79, begins near the Italian city of Resina on orders from King Charles III of Spain to his engineer, Rocque Joaquin de Alcubierre.
 November 18 – The Treaty of Vienna is ratified, ending the War of the Polish Succession. Under the terms of the treaty, Stanisław Leszczyński receives Lorraine in exchange for renouncing the Polish throne.
 December 27 – After setting off from Rotterdam in August with 240 immigrants to America, the British ship Princess Augusta is wrecked near Block Island off of the coast of the colony of Rhode Island.  During the voyage, 200 passengers and seven crew died from illness spread by contaminated water.  Another 20 die after the crew leaves and rows to shore. The wreck later becomes the subject of the legend of the "Palatine Light" ghost ship and of John Greenleaf Whittier's 1867 poem "The Palatine".

 Date unknown 
 China's Qing government announces that all western businessmen have to use the Cohong in Guangzhou to trade. 
 Pierre Louis Maupertuis publishes Sur la figure de la terre, which confirms Newton's view that the earth is an oblate spheroid, slightly flattened at the poles.
 Black Forest clockmaker Franz Ketterer produces one of the earliest cuckoo clocks.
 Carl Philipp Emanuel Bach, having completed a law degree, is hired as a court musician by Crown Prince Frederick of Prussia, the future Frederick the Great (Bach will remain in Frederick's service until 1768).
 Holy Royal Arch is founded.
 Rémy Martin is granted exclusive permission by King Louis XV of France to plant new vineyards, for impressing him with the quality of his cognac.

Births 
 January 21 – Ethan Allen, American patriot (d. 1789)
 February 6 – Pierre-Joseph Desault, French anatomist and surgeon (d. 1795)
 April 12 – Padre Francisco Garcés, Spanish missionary (d. 1781)
 April 14 – William Cavendish-Bentinck, 3rd Duke of Portland, Prime Minister of the United Kingdom (d. 1809)
 May 27 – Nathaniel Gorham, American politician (d. 1796)
 May 28 – Joseph-Ignace Guillotin, French physician (d. 1814)
 June 4 – King George III of the United Kingdom (d. 1820)
 July 3 – John Singleton Copley, American painter (d. 1815)
 July 20 – Darejan Dadiani, Georgian queen consort (d. 1807)
 July 22 – Anne d'Yves, writer, participant in the Brabant Revolution (d. 1814)
 August 13 – Scott Jamieson Dexter, classical musician (d. 1814) 
 August 28 – Etteilla, French occult cartomancer (d. 1791)
 September 25 – Nicholas Van Dyke, American lawyer and President of Delaware (d. 1789)
 October 11 – Arthur Phillip, British admiral and Governor of New South Wales (d. 1814)
 October 18 – Andrei Bolotov, Russian agriculturalist and memoirist (d. 1833)
 October 29 – Charles Spalding, Scottish inventor and underwater diver (d. 1783)

 November 15 – William Herschel, German-born astronomer (d. 1822)
 December 31 – Charles Cornwallis, 1st Marquess Cornwallis, British general (d. 1805)

Deaths 
 January 6 – Franz Xaver Murschhauser, German composer and theorist (b. 1663)
 January 24 – Samuel Andrew, American Congregational clergyman, educator (b. 1656)
 January 27 – Marie Wulf, Danish pietist leader (b. 1685) 
 January 30 – Benoît de Maillet, French diplomat and natural historian (b. 1656)
 February 9 – Béatrice Hiéronyme de Lorraine, Abbess of Remiremont (b. 1662)
 February 15 – Matthias Braun, Czech sculptor (b. 1684)
 February 27 – Henry Grove, English nonconformist minister (b. 1684)
 March 16 – George Bähr, German architect (b. 1666)
 March 25 – Turlough O'Carolan, Irish harper and composer (b. 1670)
 April 9 – Sir Charles Blois, 1st Baronet, English politician (b. 1657)
 May 1 – Charles Howard, 3rd Earl of Carlisle, English statesman (b. c. 1669)
 May 15 – Sir John Chesshyre, English lawyer (b. 1662)
 June 5 – Isaac de Beausobre, French Protestant pastor (b. 1659)
 June 21 – Charles Townshend, 2nd Viscount Townshend, English politician (b. 1674)
 July 8 – Jean-Pierre Nicéron, French encyclopedist (b. 1685)
 July 28 – Heinrich, Duke of Saxe-Merseburg (b. 1661)

 September 23 – Herman Boerhaave, Dutch humanist, physician (b. 1668)
 December 22 – Constantia Jones, English prostitute (executed) (b. c. 1708)

References